The 1905 Colorado Agricultural Aggies football team represented Colorado Agricultural College (now known as Colorado State University) in the Colorado Football Association (CFA) during the 1905 college football season.  In their second and final season under head coach John H. McIntosh, the Aggies compiled a 3–4 record and were outscored by a total of 95 to 67.

Schedule

References

Colorado Agricultural
Colorado State Rams football seasons
Colorado Agricultural Aggies football